The Salvadoran Lutheran Church (Iglesia Luterana Salvadoreña) is a Lutheran denomination in El Salvador. It is a member of the Lutheran World Federation, which it joined in 1986. It is also a member of the Caribbean Conference of Churches, the Communion of Lutheran Churches in Central America and the World Council of Churches.

External links 
Official website
Lutheran World Federation listing

Lutheran denominations
Lutheranism in South America
Lutheran World Federation members
Members of the World Council of Churches